Otira is a small township fifteen kilometres north of Arthur's Pass in the central South Island of New Zealand. It is on the northern approach to the pass, a saddle between the Otira and Bealey Rivers high in the Southern Alps. Another possible meaning is "Oti" (finished) and "ra" (Sun), because Otira Gorge is usually in deep shadow.

Otira was originally a stop on the Cobb and Co stagecoach from Canterbury to the West Coast. The Midland Line was extended from Stillwater to Jacksons in 1894 and then Otira in 1899, when the pass was navigated by coach from Otira until the railway tunnel opened in 1923. During construction of the tunnel, Otira housed about 600 workers and their families.

The Otira Railway Station was opened on 13 November 1900 (ex-Goat Creek on 15 October 1900), and closed in February 1992.

In the 1950s the town had a population of about 350, but this had dropped to 11 in 1988.

While a small number of railway houses existed at the time the Otira Tunnel was being built, the vast majority were built in 1922 and 1923. They were needed to house staff required for the greatly-upscaled railway operation following the completion of the tunnel. Love Brothers from Port Chalmers had the contract to build 43 houses in the new village. A further house was built in 1951 at the bottom end of the village road. This survives today, along with 16 others from the former railway village.

The New Zealand Railways Corporation sold the village houses to Glenstone Holdings around the end of 1990, with a peppercorn lease on the land. In 1998 the remaining 18 ex-railway houses (one has since burnt down) were sold to Chris and Bill Hennah, along with the large two-storeyed hotel, community hall and fire station. The 20-odd hectares of leased land included the school grounds. The Hennahs bought the old school building itself, and nearby indoors swimming pool in 2002.

Love Brothers also built the railway hostel for refreshment rooms staff, along with the refreshment rooms which were situated at the north end of the railway station. The 'Refresh', as it was known, closed in November 1987 with the commencement of the TranzAlpine service between Christchurch and Greymouth.

Having paid $73,000 in 1998, the Hennahs put the village on the market in 2010 with an asking price of NZ$1.5 million. No bids were received but it remained on the market. When advertised again in 2013 the sale price had dropped to NZ$1 million, and it sold the following year to Lester Rowntree for an undisclosed sum, although as at 2020 the Hennahs still own the ex-school building and swimming pool.

Not far from the hotel (originally opened in 1902 but rebuilt following a fire in 1911) is the former post office which was built in 1952 to replace an earlier one. This has been refurbished into an art gallery known as the 'John Burns Gallery of Modern Art'. The complex exhibits world class art which is a surprise to many visitors, housed as it is in the middle of the Southern Alps. The former postmaster's house also survives.

Heading up the valley, there are a number of houses dotted along the highway. Rata Lodge Backpackers is situated near Goat Creek and provides alternative accommodation to the Otira Stagecoach Hotel.

When the tunnel opened in 1923, traction power for the Otira to Arthur's Pass electrified section was provided by a steam-driven generating station known as the 'Power House' — a large imposing building which included a big shed and repair workshop for the electric locomotives.

The steam generating plant closed in July 1941, with the source of power then coming from the newly-constructed transmission line from Lake Coleridge to the West Coast. This involved building a transformer substation at Otira, along with a rectifier substation at the tunnel mouth. Staffing required at the Otira substation meant four houses were built, two of which still survive. Meanwhile the old power house has been demolished.

Close to the town are two major feats of civil engineering: the Otira Tunnel, and the Otira Viaduct.

Otira Viaduct

The Otira viaduct is to the south of Otira, between Otira and the Arthur's Pass summit. Completed in 1999 by McConnell Smith Pty Ltd, the  four-span viaduct carries State Highway 73 over a stretch of unstable land, replacing a narrow, winding, dangerous section of road that was prone to avalanches, slips and closures.  One person, Tony Western, 25, was killed during construction in July 1998 when a chain failed and a pump fell on him.  A plaque was installed in his memory in the base of the westernmost pier.

Demographics

The statistical area of Hokitika Valley-Otira, which at 1,615 square kilometres is much larger than Otira, had a population of 651 at the 2018 New Zealand census, an increase of 39 people (6.4%) since the 2013 census, and an increase of 15 people (2.4%) since the 2006 census. There were 240 households. There were 333 males and 318 females, giving a sex ratio of 1.05 males per female. The median age was 36.6 years (compared with 37.4 years nationally), with 180 people (27.6%) aged under 15 years, 96 (14.7%) aged 15 to 29, 294 (45.2%) aged 30 to 64, and 81 (12.4%) aged 65 or older.

Ethnicities were 91.2% European/Pākehā, 11.5% Māori, 0.9% Pacific peoples, 3.2% Asian, and 4.6% other ethnicities (totals add to more than 100% since people could identify with multiple ethnicities).

The proportion of people born overseas was 9.7%, compared with 27.1% nationally.

Although some people objected to giving their religion, 55.3% had no religion, 33.2% were Christian, 0.5% were Muslim and 3.2% had other religions.

Of those at least 15 years old, 54 (11.5%) people had a bachelor or higher degree, and 96 (20.4%) people had no formal qualifications. The median income was $28,500, compared with $31,800 nationally. The employment status of those at least 15 was that 255 (54.1%) people were employed full-time, 96 (20.4%) were part-time, and 9 (1.9%) were unemployed.

References

External links
Otira History
Otira Today
Photo of coal-fired electric power station at Otira c1928
Aerial photo of Otira in 1959
Stories from Otira

Westland District
Populated places in the West Coast, New Zealand